Lobophytum verum is a species soft coral of the genus Lobophytum.

References 

Alcyoniidae
Animals described in 1970